Dwarka is a neighbourhood located in South West Delhi district of Delhi. The district court that functions under the Delhi High Court for South West Delhi is located in Dwarka.

The sub-city is located near to Indira Gandhi International Airport. It is among the largest sub-city in Asia. Dwarka is organized into sectors and mainly has Cooperative Group Housing Societies as residential options. It is one of the most sought-after residential areas in New Delhi. The sub-city also has the largest rooftop solar plant in the Union territory of Delhi.

In January 2017, the Cabinet of India approved Dwarka to be the second Diplomatic Enclave for 39 countries on 34 hectares, after Chanakyapuri. In 2016, the Cabinet of India, chaired by PM Narendra Modi, approved 89.72 hectares of land for an Exhibition-cum Convention centre, estimated to cost .

Dwarka is being developed as a smart city under Delhi Development Authority's ‘smart sub-city’ project. Dwarka (Delhi Assembly constituency) and Matiala (Delhi Assembly constituency) both represent Dwarka sub-city and are one of the 70 Vidhan Sabha constituencies of Delhi.

History

Origins

Dwarka is named after the legendary Dwaraka Kingdom. It is a short distance away from Gurgaon which is a major hub for large national and multinational corporations in the country and about 10 km away from Indira Gandhi International Airport. With the opening up of the Airport Express Line in 2011, the travel time from the Dwarka Sector 21 Metro station to Airport was reduced to less than 10 minutes.

Some parts of modern-day Dwarka historically came under the colony of Pappankalan, which are now being developed under the 'Urban Expansion Projects' of the Delhi Development Authority.

A small baoli, discovered five years ago in Dwarka, has been restored and could become a tourist attraction. An elaborate conservation project by the India National Trust for Art and Cultural Heritage (Intach) for the Lodi-era baoli was completed recently. Dwarka Baoli (also known as Loharehri Baoli) is a historical stepwell recently discovered in Dwarka Sub City, in southwest New Delhi, India. It was constructed for the residents of Loharehri village by the Sultans of the Lodi Dynasty in the early 16th century. Dwarka now stands where the Loharehri village once stood.

21st century

In 2019, Minister of Home Affairs Rajnath Singh inaugurated India's first National Cyber Forensic Lab which is part of the National Cyber Coordination Centre and Cyber Protection Awareness and Detection Center (Cypad) of Delhi Police in Dwarka. The Election Commission of India has established India International Institute of Democracy and Election Management campus in Dwarka. The National Highways Authority of India headquarters, an autonomous agency of the Government of India, set up in 1988 is located in Dwarka.

The Ministry of External Affairs owns MEA Housing Complex in Dwarka, for the housing of its officials and diplomats. The Government of Delhi has approved for construction of Indira Gandhi Hospital, a super-specialty hospital in Dwarka, which will cost  and will be spread over 24 acres, to be operational from the year 2020. The Punjab National Bank opened its new corporate head office in Dwarka in 2018.

In 2020, Manipur Bhavan is being built in Dwarka by Government of Manipur. In 2021, as per media reports Government of Bihar built Bihar Sadan in Dwarka.

Politics
It is part of the Dwarka, Delhi Assembly constituency. Vinay Mishra of Aam Aadmi Party is the MLA since 2015.

Cityscape

Park
Delhi Development Authority is currently planning to establish Bharat Vandana Park, to be spread over 220 acres in sector 20.

Culture

Sports

Dwarka is home to a sports complex (DDA Sports Complex) in Sector 11 with facilities such as Tennis (Clay & Hard Courts), Badminton including covered Badminton Hall, Table Tennis, Billiards / Snooker / Pool, Basket Ball, Volley Ball, Jogging Track, Cricket, Cricket Practice Pitches, Multigym, Skating, Snack - Bar, Pro - Shop, Tennis Practice wall, Squash, Children Park, Yoga, Karate, Swimming Pool with Toddler Pool.
The Delhi Development Authority is planning to create an 18-hole state-of-the-art golf course over an area of 173 acres in Sector 24.

Location 
 The sub-city is located in South-West Delhi in the vicinity of Gurgaon and Delhi's International Airport.
 It is bounded by NH-8, Outer Ring Road, Najafgarh Road, Pankha Road Near Dabri Mor, and the Rewari railway line.
 West End, Uttam Nagar, Vasant Kunj, Vikas Puri, Najafgarh, Bijwasan, Palam vihar, Vasant Vihar, Janakpuri residential areas and Delhi cantonment are the other major surrounding areas in south/west west Delhi.
 Dwarka is the largest residential suburb in Asia, with a total of 1718 residential enclaves, and a net population of 1,100,000.

Currently, the Dwarka Sub-City (Sector 1 to 29) is divided into 5 MCD Wards: 135 - Kakraula, 136 - Matiala, 141 - Bijwasan, 145 - Palam, and 147 - Mahavir Enclave. Dwarka is divided into three Assembly Constituencies i.e. AC-34 Matiala, AC-36 Bijwasan, AC-37 Palam. It is also divided into two Parliamentary constituencies i.e. West Delhi and South Delhi. The area of Dwarka Sub-city as per DDA records is 5648 Hectares. The density of the population is around 160–200 per H A. Road length in Dwarka is 396 km.

Social issues

Sanitation

The irregularity in transportation of garbage and the South Delhi Municipal Corporation failing to clean Dwarka, has recently caused the sub-city to face a severe sanitation crisis. The Delhi High Court has been looking into the issue of lack of sanitation and cleaning in Dwarka since 2014. Civic agencies such as DDA and the municipal corporation have blamed Dwarka filth on ‘lack of civic sense’.

In February 2020, Delhi High Court directed  South Delhi Municipal Corporation and DDA to provide a healthy and safe environment to residents of the sub-city.

Crime
Two new police districts were proposed in 2016 to increase security. Dwarka sub-city, which earlier came under one police station, has been now split up between three police stations – Dwarka North, Dwarka South and Dwarka West.

Transportation

 Dwarka has a robust and well-connected road network built to modern specifications to each of its sectors and adjoining areas.
 The sub-city is well connected by metro rail with the city centre and other major parts of the city by MRTS. There are a total of 8 metro stations in Dwarka.
 Connected to Indira Gandhi International Airport Terminal 3 via Sector 21 Station interchange with the Airport Express Line.
 The sub-city is now connected via the Delhi Metro to Noida (UP) and Anand Vihar and Ghaziabad (Vaishali Station).
 The sub-city will be connected to the mother city by 4 major roads from all directions.
 If entering from the north, a 45-meter wide road connecting Pankha Road partly by covering Dabri palam drain. Work was completed and the road was opened for the public in 2007.
 If entering from the west, a 60-meter wide road connecting Najafgarh Road is constructed.
 If entering from the east, a 45-meter wide road through Cantonment area with a fly-over near Palam.  The flyover and road were opened for the public in 2006.
 If entering from the southeast, go through a 60-meter wide road from NH-8 (with a rail underpass). The road was already constructed.
 Airport Express (Orange Line) of Delhi Metro connects Dwarka to the Indira Gandhi International Airport and terminates at New Delhi metro station from where one can go to New Delhi railway station.
 Dwarka is expected to be connected to Gurgaon by metro in the near future due to its close proximity to the NCR town.

Cultural hub 
Dwarka sub-city is emerging as a cultural hub of the south-west Delhi. There are different music and dance clubs present. Shopping centres have come up in the five-star hotels and another one next to Sector 12 metro station which host few eateries and places to hang out.

In 2019, Vegas Mall, a commercial complex was inaugurated. It consists of a shopping mall, movie theatre, corporate offices and various restaurants spread over an area of 7 acres. The architecture of Vegas Mall was designed by Bentel Associates International, Johannesburg, SA.

In 2018, Pacific India was selected to develop a  shopping mall and multi-level car parking at the Dwarka Sector 21 metro station.

Mixed land use concept 
DDA has implemented a unique concept of Mixed Land Use (MLU) in Dwarka. Most of the DDA housing clusters in Dwarka have commercial buildings in close proximity. In many sectors, approximately 80% of a plot is used for residential flats and the remaining 20% for commercial use. This unique MLU concept is convenient for the occupants of Dwarka DDA flats, as they get the facility of shopping, dining and purchasing grocery in close proximity.

Social infrastructure 

The sub-city has been planned for an environment of convenience containing essential facilities and services at different levels - mainly health, education, hotel, safety and security, cultural, and communication etc. Two malls recently opened one at Dwarka sector 21 Metro Station and another near to Dwarka Sector 14 metro station.

Education

The sub-city is well equipped with multiple schools, the most famous ones being Venkateshwar International School in Sector 10 , KV Dwarka Sector 12 , KV Dwarka Sector 5 , ITL School in Sector 9, Sri Venkateshwar International School in Sector 18, Delhi Public School in Sector 3, Rajkiya Pratibha Vikas Vidyalaya in sector 5, 10 & 19 and many more.

Universities and Colleges
Faculty of Law, University of Delhi is planning a new campus in Dwarka and will be building hostels for students and residential quarters for staff members.

National Law University, Delhi and Netaji Subhas University of Technology are located in Dwarka. Guru Gobind Singh Indraprastha University, Delhi State Government's only University has its main campus located in Dwarka Sector 16-C. The campus houses University School of Law and Legal Studies and University School of Management Studies, among others. The university has around 120 affiliated colleges located in the NCR.

Along with engineering and law institutes like Bhaskaracahrya College of Applied Sciences, University School of Chemical Technology (GGSIPU), University School of Information, Communication and Technology (GGSIPU), Netaji Subhas University of Technology, Deen Dayal Upadhyaya College, Guru Gobind Singh Indraprastha University, Lal Bahadur Shastri Institute of Management and National Law University, Delhi.

See also
Dhulsiras

References

External links
District Magistrate/DM South West Delhi Government of Delhi
 
Dwarka at Delhi Development Authority website DDA
Complete Dwarka Expressway by 2022: PM Narendra Modi to road transport minister Times of India
DDA plans international sports complex in Dwarka sub-city The Indian Express
DDA plans Delhi's first adventure park for cycle sports in Dwarka The Times of India
DDA, Indian Navy to develop old-age homes in Dwarka The Economic Times
DDA plans Delhi to get new cricket stadium near Dwarka The Times of India

Neighbourhoods in Delhi
South West Delhi district
Cities and towns in South West Delhi district
Diplomatic districts
Planned cities in India
District subdivisions of Delhi
Housing cooperatives in India
Smart cities in India